Road of Hell (Spanish:Camino del infierno) is a 1946 Argentinian film from the Estudios San Miguel.

Plot
A melodramatic, psychological thriller, the film tells the story of a young wealthy widow, who is unhappy. She meets a Bohemian artist who marries her to escape the poverty of his family, but is stifled by her possessiveness and jealousy. The plot centers around a love triangle, which was bold for its time.

Cast
Mecha Ortiz 
Pedro López Lagar 
Amelia Bence 
Elsa O'Connor 
Alberto Bello

External links

References

1946 films
1940s Spanish-language films
Argentine black-and-white films
Argentine drama films
1946 drama films
Films directed by Daniel Tinayre
Films directed by Luis Saslavsky
1940s Argentine films